The Coupe de France Final 2004 was a football match held at Stade de France, Saint-Denis on 29 May 2004, that saw Paris SG defeat LB Châteauroux 1-0 thanks to a goal by Pauleta.

Match details

See also
Coupe de France 2003-04

External links
Coupe de France results at Rec.Sport.Soccer Statistics Foundation
Report on French federation site

Coupe De France Final
2004
Coupe De France Final 2004
Coupe De France Final 2004
Coupe de France Final
Sport in Saint-Denis, Seine-Saint-Denis
Coupe de France Final